Port Sutton is an unincorporated community located in the industrial section of southeastern Hillsborough County, Florida, United States. The community is served by a 33619 ZIP Code. It is adjacent to the census-designated place (CDP) of Palm River-Clair Mel and the city limits of Tampa.

Geography
Port Sutton is located at latitude 27.907 north, longitude -82.421 west, or approximately four miles southeast of Tampa. The elevation of the community is three feet above sea level.

Education
The community of Port Sutton is served by Hillsborough County Schools, which serves the entire county.

References

External links
Port Sutton page from Hometown Locator

Unincorporated communities in Hillsborough County, Florida
Unincorporated communities in Florida